James Nesbitt (22 September 1913 – October 1992) was a British athlete. He competed in the men's discus throw at the 1948 Summer Olympics.

References

External links
 

1913 births
1992 deaths
Athletes (track and field) at the 1948 Summer Olympics
British male discus throwers
Olympic athletes of Great Britain
Place of birth missing